The  is a rapid train service in Japan operated by West Japan Railway Company (JR West) and Shikoku Railway Company (JR Shikoku) since April 1988. The Marine Liner links Okayama, the capital city of Okayama Prefecture and a major station on the Sanyō Shinkansen, with Takamatsu, the capital city of Kagawa Prefecture on the island of Shikoku, via the Great Seto Bridge. Operating at a top speed of 130 km/h (81 mph), the journey takes approximately 52–63 minutes.

Overview
Since 1 October 2003, the Marine Liner has been operated by JR West 223-5000 series EMU trainsets. The first car on most Takamatsu-bound trains is a JR Shikoku 5000 series bi-level cab car with reserved seating. Previously, 213 series EMUs were used.

Some early morning and late evening trains make additional stops at intermittent stations on the Seto-Ohashi and Yosan lines.

As it is classified as a  service, only a standard fare is charged for using the Marine Liner. It currently takes about one hour to cover the entire journey. A passenger may upgrade to reserved seating, in both standard seats or Green Car seats for an additional fee.

A crew change for the train driver and conductor occurs at Kojima, the boundary station between the two operating railways.

Route

The Marine Liner runs over two sections known collectively as the Seto-Ohashi Line. The Okayama-Kojima section is operated by JR West1, and the Kojima-Takamatsu section is operated by JR Shikoku2.

1Portions run over the JR Uno Line
2Portions run over the JR Yosan Line

Stations
Key (as of December 2006)

Formations
Services are formed as 2-, 3-, 5-, or 7-car formations as shown below with car 1 at the Takamatsu end. All cars are no smoking. Most of the trains use 5-car formations.
Green: Green class (first class)
White: Standard class
G (green class), R (standard class): Reserved seats
NR (standard class only): Non-reserved seats

History
The Marine Liner service was introduced in April 1988, using 3-car 213 series EMUs formed as three-car, six-car, or nine-car formations.

References

External links

 JR West Marine Liner information 
 JR Shikoku Marine Liner information 

Named passenger trains of Japan
West Japan Railway Company
Shikoku Railway Company
Railway services introduced in 1988